The Columbus Packet, also known as The Packet, is a weekly newspaper published in Columbus, Mississippi (USA). It was founded in 1991 by editor and publisher, Roger Larsen. Starting in July 2010 Colin Krieger took over the position as editor and publisher of The Columbus Packet with Roger Larsen remaining on as a columnist.

The Packet is published once a week on Thursdays. It focuses on stories and advertisements of local interest, and has grown rapidly in circulation in recent years. As of October 2008, it has a circulation of over 11,000. A particular focus of the paper has been to increase media exposure of the affairs of local government in the Lowndes County area.

Notes

References

External links
 The Columbus Packet

Columbus, Mississippi
Lowndes County, Mississippi
Newspapers published in Mississippi